Jõhvi linnastaadion is a multi-use stadium in Jõhvi, Estonia. It is currently used mostly for football matches and is the home ground of Meistriliiga team Jõhvi FC Lokomotiv.

References

External links

 Place on the map

Jõhvi
Football venues in Estonia
Buildings and structures in Ida-Viru County